Chloral betaine (USAN, BAN) (brand names Beta-Chlor, Somilan), also known as cloral betaine (INN), is a sedative-hypnotic drug. It was introduced by Mead Johnson in the United States in 1963. It is a betaine complex with chloral hydrate, which acts as an extended-acting formulation of chloral hydrate which is then metabolized into trichloroethanol, which is responsible for most or all of its effects.

See also
 Dichloralphenazone

References

GABAA receptor positive allosteric modulators
Hypnotics
Prodrugs
Sedatives